Sir Rowland Sydney Wright CBE (4 October 1915 – 14 June 1991) was a British industrialist who served as Chancellor of the Queen's University, Belfast between 1984–91.

He was born in Northampton. He was appointed a Commander of the Order of the British Empire (CBE) in the 1970 New Year Honours. He was knighted in the 1976 Birthday Honours for his service to export as Chairman of Imperial Chemical Industries.

He died in Lewes, East Sussex, aged 75.

References

1915 births
1991 deaths
British industrialists
Commanders of the Order of the British Empire
Chancellors of Queen's University Belfast
Knights Bachelor
People educated at Nottingham High Pavement Grammar School
People from Nottingham
People from Northampton